Letter to Home is the fortieth album by American singer/guitarist Glen Campbell, released in 1984 (see 1984 in music).

Track listing

Side 1:

 "I'll Be Faithful to You" (Paul Kennerley) – 2:34
 "(Love Always) Letter to Home" (Carl Jackson) – 2:56
 "Faithless Love" (J. D. Souther) – 3:17
 "Leavin' Eyes" (Ted Hewitt) – 2:53
 "Goodnight Lady" (Steve Nobels, Buddy Cannon) – 4:06

Side 2:

 "After the Glitter Fades" (Stevie Nicks) – 2:45
 "Tennessee " (Michael Smotherman) – 3:02
 "A Lady Like You" (Jim Weatherly, Keith Stegall) – 3:32
 "Scene of the Crime" (Jackson, T.J. Kuenster) – 3:20
 "An American Trilogy" (Mickey Newbury) – 3:47

Personnel

Glen Campbell – vocals
Eddie Bayers – drums
Kenneth Bell – acoustic guitar
David Briggs – keyboards
Jerry Douglas – Dobro
Sonny Garrish – steel guitar
Carl Jackson – mandolin, banjo
Shane Keister – keyboards, synthesizer
Farrell Morris – percussion
Rodger Morris – synthesizer
Larry Paxton – bass guitar
Brent Rowan – acoustic guitar, electric guitar
Blaine Sprouse – fiddle
Paul Worley – electric guitar
Buddy Cannon – background vocals
Emmylou Harris – background vocals
Ted Hewitt – background vocals
Carl Jackson – background vocals
Joe Scaife – background vocals
The "A" Strings – strings

Production
Harold Shedd – producer
Jim Cotton – engineer
Joe Scaife – engineer
Paul Goldberg – engineer
George Clinton – engineer
Bergen White – arranger
Aaron Rapoport – photography

Charts

Weekly charts

Year-end charts

Singles

References

Glen Campbell albums
1984 albums
Albums produced by Harold Shedd
Atlantic Records albums